Barranco León is an archaeological site with an age range between 1.2 and 1.4 million of years. It was found "Niño de Orce", which was the ancient archaeological record in Western Europe with 1.4 million years in the Pleistocene, and it consist on a milk tooth of a boy or girl of 10 years.

The site was excavated in 1995 by Josep Gibert i Clols and between 1999 and 2000 by Martínez Fernández y Toro. The type of lithic industry found consists on 150 pieces of lithic flake and flint from the Mode 1.

Among the large mammals, it was found Hippopotamus antiquus, Equus altidens, Felidae cf. Homotherium sp., Megaloceros sp. and Bovini gen. et indet.

The site is listed by the Instituto Geológico y Minero de España as AND331.

References

Prehistoric sites in Spain
Ruins in Spain
Pleistocene paleontological sites of Europe
Archaeological sites in Andalusia